Reza Dana is the Claes H. Dohlman Professor of Ophthalmology, senior scientist and W. Clement Stone Clinical Research Scholar at Massachusetts Eye and Ear, Harvard Medical School, and director of the Harvard-Vision Clinical Scientist Development Program.

Dana is an internationally recognized expert in the field of corneal disorders and ocular inflammation. He is best known for his work on the molecular and cellular mechanisms of ocular inflammation with translational applications to autoimmunity, transplantation, dry eye disease, and angiogenesis. He is a member of editorial boards of 10 journals, including as editor-in-chief of Cornea.

Education and training
Dana attended the Tehran International School during his early years and graduated summa cum laude from St. Paul's School, New Hampshire. He pursued his baccalaureate degree at Johns Hopkins University School of Arts and Sciences, where he was invited to join the Phi Beta Kappa. Dr. Dana attended medical school at Johns Hopkins School of Medicine, and also obtained a master's degree in Public Health from Johns Hopkins Bloomberg School of Public Health. He received his Ophthalmology residency training at the Illinois Eye and Ear Infirmary, and clinical cornea and external diseases fellowship at Wills Eye Hospital in Philadelphia. He received advanced fellowship training in Immunology and Uveitis at the Massachusetts Eye and Ear and pursued laboratory research training in Ocular and Transplantation Immunology Laboratory at the Schepens Eye Research Institute, Harvard Medical School under the mentorship of the late J. Wayne Streilein.

Research and career
Dana joined as an instructor in the department of ophthalmology at Harvard Medical School in 1995 and has been a faculty member here ever since. In 2006, he was named the director of Cornea Service at Massachusetts Eye and Ear, and in 2007, he was appointed the Claes H. Dohlman Chair in Ophthalmology and vice chairman for academic programs. He is also an honorary professor of ophthalmology at Shanghai Medical College, Fudan University.

Dana's research focus is in the area of immuno-inflammatory disorders of the cornea and ocular surface. He has published over 370 peer-reviewed publications and over 150 reviews, edited several books and serves as the senior editor for Elsevier's Encyclopedia of the Eye. His work has been cited more than 25000 times and carries an h-index of 82. His is widely recognized for (i) identifying, phenotyping and functionally characterizing resident bone marrow-derived antigen-presenting cells (APC) of the cornea, (ii) identifying novel mechanisms of corneal APC trafficking, (iii) defining novel functional interactions between lymphatic endothelia and APC, (iv) identifying selective topical cytokine and chemokine targeting to promote transplant survival by suppressing effector T cells, (v) defining novel mechanisms employed by the corneal epithelium to maintain angiogenic privilege including the VEGFR-3 sink and PD-L1 mechanisms, (vi) developing strategies to promote corneal endothelial cell survival in transplantation, including gene therapy.

Awards and honors

1981 – National Cum Laude Society
1984 – Phi Beta Kappa (Junior Year), Johns Hopkins University
1981-85 – Dean's List (every semester), Johns Hopkins University
1989 – Henry Strong Dennison Award for Research, Johns Hopkins School of Medicine
1990 – National Eye Institute/ARVO Travel Fellowship
1995 – Heed Ophthalmic Foundation Fellowship (Ocular Immunology)
1996 – Knapp Fellow of the Society of Heed Fellows
1996 – Clinical Scientist Career Award (KO8) from NIH
1999 – Research to Prevent Blindness William & Mary Greve Special Scholar
2002 – Achievement Award, American Academy of Ophthalmology
2002 – Kronfeld Memorial Lecturer, Illinois Eye & Ear Infirmary
2002 – Fry Memorial Lecturer, Wills Eye Hospital Biennial Cornea Conference
2003 – Cogan Award, Association for Research In Vision and Ophthalmology
2003 – Dohlman Lecturer, Boston Biennial Cornea Conference
2004 – Alta Lecturer and visiting professorship, University of California San Francisco
2004 – Keynote Address, 28th All-Japan Cornea Conference, Yonago, Japan
2005 – Research to Prevent Blindness Physician Scientist-Merit Award
2006 – Service Recognition Award, American Academy of Ophthalmology
2007 – Listed, “Best Doctors of America”
2007 – Listed, “Best of Boston” Ophthalmologists, Boston Magazine
2007 – Listed, “Best Ophthalmologists of America”
2008 – Alcon Research Institute Award
2009 – Research to Prevent Blindness Lew R. Wasserman-Merit Award
2011 – David Easty Lecturer, Bowman Club, Royal College of Surgeons, Edinburgh
2011 – Joaquin Barraquer Lecture, Spanish Congress of Ophthalmology
2011 – LSU Chancellor's Award in Neuroscience and Ophthalmology
2012 – Mentoring Award, European Young Investigator Network for Ocular Surface Inflammation
2013 – Senior Scientific Investigator Award, Research to Prevent Blindness
2013 – Gold Fellow, Association for Research in Vision and Ophthalmology
2013 – Keynote Speaker, Biennial Meeting of the European Society of Ophthalmology, Copenhagen, Denmark
2014 – Thygeson Lecture, Ocular Microbiology and Immunology Group
2014 – A. Clifford Barger Excellence in Mentoring Award, Harvard Medical School
2015 – Kersley Lecture, British Ocular Surface Society, London, England
2015 – Keynote Address & Certificate of Honor, European Association for Vision and Eye Research, Nice, France
2016 – Roger Meyer Lecture, University of Michigan Kellogg Eye Center
2016 – Elected, Academia Ophthalmologica Internationalis
2016 – Mooney Lecture, Irish College of Ophthalmologists, Republic of Ireland
2016 – Endre A. Balazs Prize, International Society for Eye Research
2017 – Plenary Address, 121st Meeting of Japanese Ophthalmological Society
2017 – Senior Achievement Award, American Academy of Ophthalmology
2017 – Streilein Lecture, 30th Biennial Cornea Conference
2018 – Friedenwald Award, Association for Research in Vision and Ophthalmology (ARVO)
2018 – Research to Prevent Blindness Stein Innovation Award
2019 – Ellis Island Medal of Honor
2020 – Power List 2020 – The Ophthalmologist

Teaching and Mentoring
Dana is the vice chair of academic programs at the Department of Ophthalmology, Massachusetts Eye and Ear and a faculty for the Graduate Program in Immunology, Harvard Medical School. He is the recipient of the Harvard Medical School Clifford Barger Excellence in Mentoring Award, the top mentoring award bestowed at Harvard Medical School. He has mentored over 120 postdoctoral research fellows from 33 countries, 80 clinical fellows and residents, medical students, and graduate students enrolled in Harvard Medical School. He is the director of the NIH-funded Harvard-Vision Clinical Scientist Development Program since 2004.

References

External links

Living people
American immunologists
American ophthalmologists
Year of birth missing (living people)
Harvard University alumni
Johns Hopkins University alumni
Johns Hopkins School of Medicine alumni
Johns Hopkins Bloomberg School of Public Health alumni
St. Paul's School (New Hampshire) alumni
Harvard Medical School faculty